John Frederick Frank  (March 11, 1873 – March 27, 1950) was an outfielder in Major League Baseball for the Cleveland Spiders in 1898. He played through 1903 in the minor leagues.

External links

1873 births
1950 deaths
Major League Baseball outfielders
Cleveland Spiders players
Baseball players from Kentucky
19th-century baseball players
Reading Actives players
Dayton Old Soldiers players
Dayton Veterans players
New Castle Quakers players
Selma Christians players
Columbus Senators players
Atlanta Firemen players
Little Rock Travelers players
People from Louisa, Kentucky